Zhuanlema is a monotypic genus of southeast Asian long-legged cave spiders containing the single species, Zhuanlema peteri. It was first described by H. F. Zhao, S. Q. Li and A. B. Zhang in 2020, and it has only been found in Laos.

See also
 List of Telemidae species

References

Monotypic Telemidae genera
Arthropods of Laos